Julien Mette (born 28 December 1981) is a French football manager who is the manager of the Djibouti national team.

Career
Mette was appointed manager of the Djibouti national team in March 2019, following spells with Congo Premier League clubs Tongo and AS Otôho.

References

External links
 

1981 births
Living people
Sportspeople from Gironde
French football managers
French expatriate football managers
French expatriate sportspeople in the Republic of the Congo
French expatriates in Djibouti
Djibouti national football team managers